The Ministry of International Relations and La Francophonie (French: Ministère des Relations internationales et de la Francophonie) is a department in the Government of Quebec. Its primary task is to "promote and defend Québec’s interests internationally."

It was established by the government of Daniel Johnson in 1967 as the Ministry of Intergovernmental Affairs, replacing and expanding on an earlier Ministry of Federal-Provincial Relations.

As of 2010, one of the ministry's responsibilities is overseeing Quebec's relationship with the Francophonie. This responsibility was formerly held by a different member of cabinet.

The department is overseen by the Minister of International Relations, who is also styled as the minister responsible for the Francophonie. The current minister is Nadine Girault.

Sylvain Simard, who served as minister from 1996 to 1998, was also styled as the minister responsible for international humanitarian action from 1997 to 1998.

Quebec Government Offices
The ministry operates the Quebec Government Offices, de facto embassies which serve as communication depots between the Government of Quebec and governments outside of Canada. None of the offices in 28 countries have official diplomatic accreditation, but they serve as venues for paradiplomacy.

See also
 Alberta International and Intergovernmental Relations
 Ontario Ministry of Intergovernmental Affairs
 Saskatchewan Ministry of Intergovernmental Affairs

References

External links
Official website

Quebec
International Relations
1967 establishments in Quebec
Government agencies established in 1967